An oblast (Cyrillic (in most languages, including Kazakh: , Russian and Ukrainian: ,)) is a type of administrative division within some Slavic areas, the Russian Empire, and the Soviet Union; it continues to be used in Russia and some post-Imperial/Soviet states. The term oblast has no universal definition or exact comparison in English, although it has been presented as analogous to the term "county" in the U.S.

Official terms in successor states of the Soviet Union differ, but some still use a cognate of the Russian term, e.g., vobłasć (voblasts, voblasts, official orthography: , Taraškievica:) is used for regions of Belarus,  for regions of Kazakhstan, and oblusu for regions of Kyrgyzstan.

The term is often translated as "area", "zone", "province" or "region". The last translation may lead to confusion, because "raion" may be used for other kinds of administrative division, which may be translated as "region", "district" or "county" depending on the context.  
Unlike "province", translations as "area", "zone", and "region" may lead to confusion because they have very common meanings other than a political division.

Bulgaria

Since 1999, Bulgaria has been divided into 28 oblasts, usually translated as "provinces". Before, the country was divided into just nine units, also called oblasts.

Russian Empire

In the Russian Empire, oblasts were considered to be administrative units and were included as parts of Governorates General or krais. The majority of then-existing oblasts were on the periphery of the country (e.g. Kars Oblast or Transcaspian Oblast) or covered the areas where Cossacks lived.

Soviet Union

In the Soviet Union, oblasts were one of the types of administrative divisions of the union republics. As any administrative units of this level, oblasts were composed of districts (raions) and cities/towns directly under oblasts' jurisdiction. Some oblasts also included autonomous entities called autonomous okrugs.  Because of the Soviet Union electrification program under the GOELRO plan, Ivan Alexandrov, as director of the Regionalisation Committee of Gosplan, divided the Soviet Union into thirteen European and eight Asiatic oblasts, using rational economic planning rather than "the vestiges of lost sovereign rights".

The names of oblasts did not usually correspond to the names of the respective historical regions, as they were created as purely administrative units.  With a few exceptions, Soviet oblasts were named after their administrative centers.

Post-Soviet states
The oblasts in other post-Soviet countries are officially called:

Viloyat and welaýat are derived from the Turkish language term vilayet, itself derived from the Arabic language term wilāya

Yugoslavia

In 1922, the Kingdom of Serbs, Croats and Slovenes was divided into 33 administrative divisions also called oblasts. In 1929, oblasts were replaced with larger administrative units known as banovinas.

During the Yugoslav Wars, several Serb Autonomous Oblasts were formed in Bosnia and Herzegovina, and Croatia. These oblasts were later merged into the Republic of Serbian Krajina and the Republika Srpska.

See also

 Autonomous oblast
 Guberniya, an administrative unit, comparable to an oblast, of the Russian Empire, early Russian SFSR, and the Soviet Union
 Raion, district or sub-division of an Oblast
 Krai
 Okrug
 Political divisions of Russia

References

External links

Types of administrative division
Russian-language designations of territorial entities